Natalya Sokolova (born 23 October 1973, Chelyabinsk, Russian SFSR) is a biathlete who has represented Belarus since the start of the 2004–05 season. With Russia, she has won a relay gold medal at the European Championships, and she has also won an individual European gold medal and finished on the podium in a World Cup race once, with a third place in a pursuit race in Pokljuka. She is ranked 18th in the Biathlon World Cup 2006–07 season, which is her first top-30 rank in the World Cup standings. Her best placing at the World Championships is 34th at the individual event in 2007.

External links
 
 

1973 births
Living people
Russian female biathletes
Belarusian female biathletes
Sportspeople from Chelyabinsk
Belarusian people of Russian descent